Codex Chisianus 45 (also Codex Chigianus 45; Vatican Library, Chigi R. VII 45; numbered 88 in Rahlfs Septuagint manuscripts, 87 in Field's Hexapla) is a 10th-century biblical manuscript, first edited in 1772.

The content of the so-called Syro-Hexaplar Codex (dated 616/7), which contains a Syriac translation of Origen's recension, has been adduced to corroborate the authenticity of the Greek text of Codex Chisianus.

The Septuagint text of the Book of Daniel had disappeared almost entirely from Greek tradition at the end of the 4th century, being superseded by the revised text of Theodotion.

John Gwynn concurred with Jerome that the church was right to adopt Theodotion's Greek text of Daniel in place of the LXX version attested in the Codex Chisianus:
Indeed, the greater part of this Chisian Daniel cannot be said to deserve the name of a translation at all. It deviates from the original in every possible way; transposes, expands, abridges, adds or omits, at pleasure. The latter chapters it so entirely rewrites that the predictions are perverted, sometimes even reversed, in scope.

The papyrus was housed at the Chigi Library in Rome until 1922. It was given to the Vatican Library.
It was the only surviving version of the original Septuagint text of the Book of Daniel until the 1931 discovery of Papyrus 967 (Chester Beatty IX/X).

See also
Susanna (Book of Daniel)

References

9th-century manuscripts
Book of Daniel
Early versions of the Bible
Septuagint manuscripts